Standard Liège did not manage to win a trophy in the 2006–07 season, falling short to Club Brugge in the domestic cup final, and finishing some way behind champions Anderlecht in the domestic league. The main disappointment was failing to qualify for either the UEFA Champions League or the UEFA Cup group stages, which saw Johan Boskamp being sacked already on 30 August. He was then replaced by legendary goalkeeper Michel Preud'homme for the remainder of the season.

Squad

Goalkeepers
  Olivier Renard
  Jérémy De Vriendt
  Rorys Aragón

Defenders
  Rogério Matias
  Philippe Léonard
  Nuno Coelho
  Mohamed Sarr
  Frédéric Dupré
  Oguchi Onyewu
  Eric Deflandre
  Fred
  Marcos Camozzato
  Felipe
  Dante

Midfielders
  Milan Rapaić
  Karel Geraerts 
  Axel Witsel
  Sérgio Conceição
  Steven Defour
  Gabriel N'Galula
  Siramana Dembélé
  Marouane Fellaini
  Mustapha Oussalah
  Yanis Papassarantis

Attackers
  Milan Jovanović
  Ali Lukunku
  Ricardo Sá Pinto
  Igor de Camargo

First Division

Matches

Sources
   RSSSF - Belgium 2006/07

Standard Liège seasons
Standard Liege